Victoria Azarenka was the defending champion, but lost to Marion Bartoli in the quarterfinals, which ended Azarenka's 26-match winning streak to start the 2012 season.

Agnieszka Radwańska won her second Premier Mandatory title and first Miami Masters title, defeating defending finalist Maria Sharapova in straight sets. Radwańska did not drop a set the whole tournament.

This tournament also marks the first WTA main draw appearance of two-time Grand Slam champion, Garbiñe Muguruza, where she made the fourth round before losing to eventual champion, Radwańska.

Seeds
All seeds received a bye into the second round.

  Victoria Azarenka (quarterfinals)
  Maria Sharapova (final)
  Petra Kvitová (second round)
  Caroline Wozniacki (semifinals)
  Agnieszka Radwańska (champion)
  Samantha Stosur (fourth round)
  Marion Bartoli (semifinals)
  Li Na (quarterfinals)
  Vera Zvonareva (second round)
  Serena Williams (quarterfinals)
  Francesca Schiavone (second round)
  Sabine Lisicki (fourth round)
  Jelena Janković (second round)
  Julia Görges (second round)
  Ana Ivanovic (fourth round)
  Dominika Cibulková (fourth round)
  Peng Shuai (third round)
 Angelique Kerber (second round)
 Anastasia Pavlyuchenkova (second round)
 Daniela Hantuchová (third round)
 Roberta Vinci (third round)
 Maria Kirilenko (fourth round)
 Yanina Wickmayer (fourth round)
 Flavia Pennetta (third round)
 Anabel Medina Garrigues (second round)
 Svetlana Kuznetsova (second round)
 Lucie Šafářová (second round)
 Monica Niculescu (second round)
 Petra Cetkovská (third round)
 Sara Errani (second round)
 Kaia Kanepi (second round)
 Nadia Petrova (second round)

Draw

Finals

Top half

Section 1

Section 2

Section 3

Section 4

Bottom half

Section 5

Section 6

Section 7

Section 8

Qualifying

Seeds

  Kateryna Bondarenko (qualified)
  Anne Keothavong (first round)
  Hsieh Su-wei (qualifying competition)
  Vera Dushevina (qualified)
  Varvara Lepchenko (qualifying competition)
  Alexandra Panova (first round)
  Urszula Radwańska (qualified)
  Olga Govortsova (first round)
  Stéphanie Foretz Gacon (qualified)
  Sloane Stephens (qualified)
  Stéphanie Dubois (first round)
  Mandy Minella (qualifying competition)
 Patricia Mayr-Achleitner (first round)
 Edina Gallovits-Hall (first round)
 Nina Bratchikova (first round)
 Arantxa Rus (qualifying competition)
 Jamie Hampton (qualified)
 Irina Falconi (first round)
 Anastasia Rodionova (qualifying competition)
 Chang Kai-chen (first round, retired)
 Lara Arruabarrena Vecino (first round)
 Eva Birnerová (qualified)
 Alla Kudryavtseva (first round)
 Valeria Savinykh (qualified)

Qualifiers

 Kateryna Bondarenko
 Misaki Doi
 Alizé Cornet
 Vera Dushevina
 Valeria Savinykh
 Melinda Czink
 Urszula Radwańska
 Madison Keys
 Stéphanie Foretz Gacon
 Sloane Stephens
 Eva Birnerová
 Jamie Hampton

Draw

First qualifier

Second qualifier

Third qualifier

Fourth qualifier

Fifth qualifier

Sixth qualifier

Seventh qualifier

Eighth qualifier

Ninth qualifier

Tenth qualifier

Eleventh qualifier

Twelfth qualifier

External links
 WTA tournament draws
 ITF tournament draws

Sony Ericsson Open - Women's Singles
2012 Sony Ericsson Open
Women in Florida